The crocodile icefish or white-blooded fish comprise a family (Channichthyidae) of notothenioid fish found in the Southern Ocean around Antarctica. They are the only known vertebrates to lack hemoglobin in their blood as adults. Icefish populations are known to reside in the Atlantic and Indian sectors of the Southern Ocean, as well as the continental shelf waters surrounding Antarctica. One icefish, Champsocephalus esox, is distributed north of the Antarctic Polar Frontal Zone. At least 16 species of crocodile icefish are currently recognized, although eight additional species have been proposed for the icefish genus Channichthys.

In February 2021, scientists discovered and documented a breeding colony of Neopagetopsis ionah icefish estimated to have 60 million active nests across an area of approximately 92 square miles at the bottom of the Weddell Sea in Antarctica. The majority of nests were occupied by one adult fish guarding an approximated estimate of 1,735 eggs in each nest.

Genera
The following genera have been classified within the family Channichthyidae:

 Chaenocephalus Richardson, 1844 
 Chaenodraco Regan, 1914
 Champsocephalus Gill, 1861
 Channichthys Richardson, 1844
 Chionobathyscus Andriashev & Neyelov, 1978
 Chionodraco Lönnberg, 1905
 Cryodraco Dollo, 1900
 Dacodraco Waite, 1916
 Neopagetopsis , 1947
 Pagetopsis Regan, 1913
 Pseudochaenichthys Norman, 1937

Diet and body size

All icefish are believed to be piscivorous, but can also feed on krill. Icefish are typically ambush predators; thus, they can survive long periods between feeding, and often consume fish up to 50% of their own body length. Maximum body lengths of  have been recorded in these species.

Respiratory and circulatory system

Icefish blood is colorless because it lacks hemoglobin, the oxygen-binding protein in blood. Channichthyidae are the only known vertebrates to lack hemoglobin as adults. Although they do not manufacture hemoglobin, remnants of hemoglobin genes can be found in their genome. The hemoglobin protein is made of two subunits (alpha and beta). In 15 of the 16 icefish species, the beta subunit gene has been completely deleted and the alpha subunit gene has been partially deleted.  One icefish species, Neopagetopsis ionah, has a more complete, but still nonfunctional, hemoglobin gene.

Red blood cells (RBCs) are usually absent, and if present, are rare and defunct. Oxygen is dissolved in the plasma and transported throughout the body without the hemoglobin protein. The fish can live without hemoglobin via low metabolic rates and the high solubility of oxygen in water at the low temperatures of their environment (the solubility of a gas tends to increase as temperature decreases). However, the oxygen-carrying capacity of icefish blood is less than 10% that of their relatives with hemoglobin.

Myoglobin, the oxygen-binding protein used in muscles, is absent from all icefish skeletal muscles. In 10 species, myoglobin is found in the heart muscle, specifically ventricles. Loss of myoglobin gene expression in icefish heart ventricles has occurred at least four separate times.

To compensate for the absence of hemoglobin, icefish have larger blood vessels (including capillaries), greater blood volumes (four-fold those of other fish), larger hearts, and greater cardiac outputs (five-fold greater) compared to other fish. Their hearts lack coronary arteries, and the ventricle muscles are very spongy, enabling them to absorb oxygen directly from the blood they pump. Their hearts, large blood vessels and low-viscosity (RBC-free) blood are specialized to carry out very high flow rates at low pressures. This helps to reduce the problems caused by the lack of hemoglobin. In the past, their scaleless skin had been widely thought to help absorb oxygen. However, current analysis has shown that the amount of oxygen absorbed by the skin is much less than that absorbed through the gills. The little extra oxygen absorbed by the skin may play a part in supplementing the oxygen supply to the heart, which receives venous blood from the skin and body before pumping it to the gills. Additionally, icefish have larger cardiac mitochondria and increased mitochondrial biogenesis in comparison to red-blooded notothenioids. This adaptation facilitates enhanced oxygen delivery by increasing mitochondrial surface area, and reducing distance between the extracellular area and the mitochondria.

Evolution

The icefish are considered a monophyletic group and likely descended from a sluggish demersal ancestor. The cold, well-mixed, oxygen-rich waters of the Southern Ocean provided an environment where a fish with a low metabolic rate could survive even without hemoglobin, albeit less efficiently. 

When the icefish evolved is unknown; two main competing hypotheses have been postulated. The first is that they are only about 6 million years old, appearing after the Southern Ocean cooled significantly. The second suggests that they are much older, 15-20 million years.

Although the evolution of icefish is still disputed, the formation of the Antarctic Polar Frontal Zone (APFZ) and the Antarctic Circumpolar Current (ACC) is widely believed to mark the beginning of the evolution of Antarctic fish. This current formed 25-22 million years ago, and thermally isolated the Southern Ocean by separating it from the warm subtropical gyres to the north.

During the mid-Tertiary period, a species crash in the Southern Ocean opened up wide range of empty niches to colonize. Despite the hemoglobin-less mutants being less fit, the lack of competition allowed even the mutants to leave descendants that colonized empty habitats and evolved compensations for their mutations. Later, the periodic openings of fjords created habitats that were colonized by a few individuals. These conditions may have also allowed for the loss of myoglobin.

Loss of hemoglobin 
The loss of hemoglobin was initially believed to be an adaptation to the extreme cold, as the lack of hemoglobin and red blood cells decreases blood viscosity, which is an adaptation that has been seen in species adapted to cold climates.  In refuting this original hypothesis, previous analysis has proposed that the lack of hemoglobin, while not lethal, is not adaptive. Any adaptive advantages incurred by reduced blood viscosity are outweighed by the fact that icefish must pump much more blood per unit of time to make up for the reduced oxygen carrying capacity of their blood. The high blood volume of icefish is itself evidence that the loss of hemoglobin and myoglobin was not advantageous for the ancestor of the icefish. Their unusual cardiovascular physiology, including large heart, high blood volume, increased mitochondrial density, and extensive microvasculature, suggests that icefish have had to evolve ways of coping with the impairment of their oxygen binding and transport systems.

Recent research by Corliss et al. (2019) claims that the loss of hemoglobin has adaptive value. Iron is a limiting nutrient in the environments inhabited by the icefish. By no longer synthesizing hemoglobin, they claim that icefish are minimizing endogenous iron use. To demonstrate this, they obtained retinal samples of Champsocephalus gunnari and stained them to detect hemoglobin alpha 3'f. They found expression of hemoglobin alpha 3'f within the retinal vasculature of Champsocephalus gunnari, demonstrating for the first time that there is limited transcription and translation of a hemoglobin gene fragment within an icefish. Because this fragment of hemoglobin does not contain any iron binding sites, the finding suggests that hemoglobin was selected against to conserve iron.

Loss of myoglobin 
Phylogenetic relationships indicate that the nonexpression of myoglobin in cardiac tissue has evolved at least four discrete times. This repeated loss suggests that cardiac myoglobin may be vestigial or even detrimental to icefish. Sidell and O'Brien (2006) investigated this possibility. First, they performed a test using stopped flow spectrometry. They found that across all temperatures, oxygen binds and dissociates faster from icefish than it does from mammalian myoglobin. However, when they repeated the test with each organism at a temperature that accurately reflected its native environment, the myoglobin performance was roughly equivalent between icefish and mammals. So, they concluded that icefish myoglobin is neither more nor less functional than the myoglobin in other clades. This means that  myoglobin is unlikely to have been selected against. The same researchers then performed a test in which they selectively inhibited cardiac myoglobin in icefish with natural myoglobin expression. They found that icefish species that naturally lack cardiac myoglobin performed better without myoglobin than did fish that naturally express cardiac myoglobin. This finding suggests that fish without cardiac myoglobin have undergone compensatory adaptation.

Reason for trait fix 

The Southern Ocean is an atypical environment. To begin with, the Southern Ocean has been characterized by extremely cold but stable temperatures for the past 10-14 million years. These cold temperatures, which allow for higher water oxygen content, combined with a high degree of vertical mixing in these waters, means  oxygen availability in Antarctic waters is unusually high. The loss of hemoglobin and myoglobin would have negative consequences in warmer environments. The stability in temperature is also "lucky", as strong fluctuations in temperature would create a more stressful environment that would likely weed out individuals with deleterious mutations. Although most research suggests that the loss of hemoglobin in icefish was a neutral or maladaptive trait that arose due to a random evolutionary event, some researchers have also suggested that the loss of hemoglobin might be tied to a necessary adaptation for the icefish. Most animals require iron for hemoglobin production, and iron is often limited in ocean environments. Through hemoglobin loss, icefish may minimize their iron requirements. This minimization could have aided the icefish survival 8.5 million years ago when Arctic diversity plummeted dramatically.

Cardiovascular physiology 

The key to solving this conundrum is to consider the other functions that both hemoglobin and myoglobin perform. While emphasis is often placed and understandably so on the importance of hemoglobin and myoglobin in oxygen delivery and use, recent studies have found that both proteins are actually also involved in the process of breaking down nitric oxide. This means that when icefish lost hemoglobin and myoglobin, it did not just mean a decreased ability to transport oxygen, but it also meant that total nitric oxide levels were elevated. Nitric oxide plays a role in regulating various cardiovascular processes in icefish, such as the dilation of branchial vasculature, cardiac stroke volume, and power output. The presence of nitric oxide also can increase angiogenesis, mitochondrial biogenesis, and cause muscle hypertrophy; all of these traits are characteristics of icefish. The similarity between nitric oxide-mediated trait expression and the unusual cardiovascular traits of icefish suggests that while these abnormal traits have evolved over time, much of these traits were simply an immediate physiological response to heightened levels of nitric oxide, which may in turn have led to a process of homeostatic evolution. In addition, the heightened levels of nitric oxide that followed as an inevitable consequence of the loss of hemoglobin and myoglobin may have actually provided an automatic compensation, allowing for the fish to make up for the hit to their oxygen transport system and thereby providing a grace period of the fixation of these less than desirable traits.

References

External links 

 A story about the use of the crocodile icefish for medical research
 HHMI video about the discovery and natural history of the icefish (requires FLASH)